Brian Kellow (March 1, 1959 – July 22, 2018) was an American biographer and magazine editor. As an editor at Opera News from 1988 to 2016, he commissioned hundreds of articles from a range of writers, seeking out well-known voices and cultivating young talent. In addition to his monthly column in Opera News, his own articles appeared in Vanity Fair, The Wall Street Journal, The New York Observer, Opera, and other publications.

He was the author of five biographies: Can't Help Singing: The Life of Eileen Farrell, published in 2000, The Bennetts: An Acting Family, Ethel Merman: A Life, Pauline Kael: A Life in the Dark, and Can I Go Now? The Life of Sue Mengers, Hollywood's First Superagent.

He was married to Scott Barnes and at the time of his death lived in Florida and New York.

References

1959 births
2018 deaths
Oregon State University alumni
20th-century American biographers
American gay writers
American music critics
20th-century American male writers
21st-century American biographers
21st-century American male writers
American magazine editors
21st-century LGBT people